The women's downhill event of the 2002 Winter Olympics was held at Snowbasin on Tuesday, February 12. 

Carole Montillet was the surprise winner, and favorites Isolde Kostner (silver) and Renate Götschl (bronze) were the other  medalists.

Results
The race was started at 12:10 local time, (UTC −7).

References

External links
Official Olympic Report
FIS results

Downhill